Broek  is a small village in De Fryske Marren in the province of Friesland, the Netherlands. It had a population of around 190 in 2017.

History
The village was first mentioned in 1482 as Broech, and means "swampy land". Broek is a stretched out settlement, and the signs use Broek-Noord (north) and Broek-Zuid (south), because the two parts are not interconnected. In 1840, it was home to 158 people. The current church dates from 1913. Since 2014, it also functions as a village centre.

Before 2009, Broek was part of the Skarsterlân municipality and before 1984 it was part of Doniawerstal.

Gallery

References

External links

De Fryske Marren
Populated places in Friesland